Attonitus bounites is one of three species of fish of family Characidae in order of Characiformes. They are primarily found within the tropical South American Madre de Dios River drainage basin. The males can reach 2.24 in (5.7 cm) in total length.

References

External links
  ITIS
  AQUATAB.NET (Spanish)
  Catalogue of Life

Freshwater fish of South America
Fish described in 2000